A dhuni is (according to the Indian religions such as Hinduism, Buddhism, Jainism, etc.) a sacred site represented as a cleft in the ground. This cleft is emblematic of the yoni or female vulva and generative organ. A dhuni therefore represents a site of worship dedicated to Shakti.

The dhuni (or dhunga) is also a term used in Indian cuisine to describe the process of cooking food by placing smoking charcoal into the finished dish.

Honoring the dhuni
Sitting by the dhuni is believed to "purify one's vibrations" and to have beneficial impact on physical and mental health.

See also 
Homa (ritual)
Dhupa

References

2. Kapilnath, Shri. Awakening the Nath Dhuni: Tantric Guidelines for Perfect Pyromania

External links 
Shirdi Sai Baba Dhuni
https://goodkorma.com/2017/03/09/up-in-smoke/

Religious places
Objects used in Hindu worship
Yajna
Sai Baba of Shirdi
Ceremonial flames
Traditions involving fire